Dryops may refer to:
 Dryops (beetle), a genus of beetles in family Dryopidae
 Dryops (crater), a crater on Callisto, a moon of Jupiter (see List of craters on Callisto)

In Greek mythology:
 Dryops, a son of King Priam of Troy
 Dryops (Oeta), a king of Oeta and son of the river-god Spercheus
 Dryops, a son of Apollo by Dia
 Dryops, a companion of Aeneas, killed by Clausus, king of the Sabines
Dryops (mythology) for characters in Greek mythology named Dryops